Formica lusatica is a species of ant belonging to the family Formicidae.

It is native to Northern Europe.

References

lusatica